Pablo Hütt García (born 25 March 1989 in Léon, Mexico) is a Mexican professional footballer.

Career
Hütt started his career at Mexican lower division side Club América before joining Atlante with whom he clinched promotion to the top tier of Mexican football. He then played for Dorados and Morelia.

He spent one year at CSD Municipal of the Guatemalan First Division, and made one late substitute appearance for the club in a 2010-11 CONCACAF Champions League Group Stage loss against Santos Laguna.

References

External links
  - Rojos.com 

1989 births
Living people
C.S.D. Municipal players
Footballers from Guanajuato
Sportspeople from León, Guanajuato
Mexican expatriate footballers
Mexican footballers
Atlante F.C. footballers
Dorados de Sinaloa footballers
Atlético Morelia players
Once Municipal footballers
Expatriate footballers in Guatemala
Expatriate footballers in El Salvador
Association football midfielders
Universiade bronze medalists for Mexico
Universiade medalists in football